Men is the plural of man, for an adult male human being.

Men or MEN may also refer to:

People
 Human, a species of ape
 Men (name), list of people so named
 Ordinary soldiers, as distinct from Officer (armed forces) grades

Arts and entertainment

Films
 Men (1924 film), a silent drama starring Pola Negri
 Men (2022 film), a folk horror starring Jessie Buckley and Rory Kinnear
 Men..., a 1985 West German comedy directed by Doris Dörrie

Music
 MEN (band)
 "Men" (song), a 1991 single by The Forester Sisters

Periodicals
 Manchester Evening News, a regional daily newspaper in North West England
 Men (magazine), a gay pornographic magazine

Other media
 Man (Middle-earth), the fictional race of mortals in J. R. R. Tolkien's Middle-earth books
 Men (kendo), one of the five strikes in kendo
 Men (TV series), a 1989 American television series
 Men.com, a gay pornographic website

Astronomy
 Mensa (constellation), a constellation in the southern sky (by IAU abbreviation)
 Chinese for the star Alpha Lupi

Religion
 Men (deity), an ancient Phrygian god
 Menachot, part of the Kodashim

Other uses
 Menheniot railway station, Cornwall, England (GBR code: MEN)
 Ministry of National Education (Madagascar), Le Ministre de l’Éducation Nationale
 Ministry of National Education (Poland)
 Multiple endocrine neoplasia, a medical condition with tumors of endocrine glands
 Men (Armenian letter), part of the Armenian alphabet

See also
 Man (disambiguation)
 Mans (disambiguation)
 The Men (disambiguation)